Robert Hooker or Hoker, alias Vowell (by 1466–1537), of Exeter, Devon, was an English Member of Parliament.

He was a Member (MP) of the Parliament of England for Exeter in 1529. He was Mayor of Exeter 1529-30. He died during a plague outbreak.

References

15th-century births
1537 deaths
Members of the Parliament of England (pre-1707) for Exeter
English MPs 1529–1536
Mayors of Exeter